The 1948 Paris–Roubaix was the 46th edition of the Paris–Roubaix, a classic one-day cycle race in France. The single day event was held on 4 April 1948 and stretched  from Paris to the finish at Roubaix Velodrome. The winner was Rik Van Steenbergen from Belgium.

Results

References

Paris–Roubaix
Paris–Roubaix
Paris–Roubaix
Paris–Roubaix
Paris–Roubaix
Paris–Roubaix